The Rothschilds is a musical with a book by Sherman Yellen, lyrics by Sheldon Harnick and music by Jerry Bock.

Based on The Rothschilds by Frederic Morton, it tells of the rise of the Rothschild family from humble beginnings in Germany, to their founding of their financial empire and growing political influence under the guidance of patriarch Mayer Rothschild, to their assistance in funding Napoleon's defeat, and how they secure a declaration of rights for European Jews in the midst of an oppressive era.

The Rothschilds was the last collaboration between Bock and Harnick. The musical ran on Broadway in 1970, earning nine Tony Award nominations, and was revived successfully Off-Broadway in 1990. A 2015 reworking of the show was praised for clarifying the show and was recorded on JAY records.

Productions
In 1968, Derek Goldby was engaged as the show's director.  During out-of-town tryouts, he was replaced by Michael Kidd, which caused a disagreement between Bock and Harnick that ended their partnership.

After thirteen previews, the Broadway production, produced by Emanuel Azenberg and directed and choreographed by Kidd, opened on October 19, 1970, at the Lunt-Fontanne Theatre, where it ran for 505 performances, closing on January 1, 1972. The cast included Hal Linden as Mayer Rothschild, Leila Martin as Gutele, Jill Clayburgh as Hannah Cohen, Keene Curtis in the multiple roles of the various national leaders doing business with the Rothschild family (Prince William of Hesse, Joseph Fouché, Herries, and Prince Metternich), Paul Hecht as Nathan Rothschild, Chris Sarandon as Jacob Rothschild, and Robby Benson as young Solomon Rothschild. Reid Shelton replaced Curtis later in the run.  The show enjoyed a second production in San Francisco.

An Off-Broadway revival directed by Lonny Price and choreographed by Michael Arnold opened on February 10, 1990, at the American Jewish Theatre, where it ran for 435 performances. The cast included Mike Burstyn as Mayer, Leslie Ellis as Hannah, Allen Fitzpatrick in the multiple roles of  Prince William of Hesse, Joseph Fouché, Herries, and Prince Metternich, Robert Cuccioli as Nathan, and David Cantor as Amshel.

Synopsis
In 1772 Frankfurt, Germany, Jews are restricted to living in the ghetto and frequently are the victims of violence (“Pleasure and Privilege”). Mayer Amschel Rothschild returns from Hanover, where he was an apprentice banker, to make his fortune in his home town. Because only twelve Jewish marriages are permitted in a given year, he is forced to come up with a plan in order to marry his fiancée Gutele (“One Room”). He reopens his shop, carrying goods and rare coins. At the Frankfurt Fair, he entices Prince William of Hesse with fanciful tales about rare coins (“He Tossed A Coin”), then bribes the prince in order to marry Gutele. Later, Mayer becomes agent for the court bankers, but he wants more.

By 1778, Mayer and Gutele have five sons (“Sons”), each of whom enters the business as soon as he is old enough. As they age, they and their father chafe at the many restrictions and indignities heaped upon Jews (“Everything”). In 1804, their success and their chutzpah take them to Denmark as superior court agents to the Danish king when Hesse must loan money to him to help fight a war (“Rothschilds and Sons”). However, Hesse is overthrown by Napoleon, and Minister of Police Joseph Fouché takes over (“Allons”). When Mayer and his sons return to Germany, they find no court for which they can be agents. Mayer sends his older sons off to collect Hesse's debts before the French can get them, and sends his younger son, Nathan, to London to invest the money (“Sons" (reprise)).

Initially awkward in England, Nathan soon displays considerable investing talents (“This Amazing London Town”). He falls in love with Hannah Cohen, an aristocratic English "Jewish Joan of Arc" devoted to charitable works (“I’m in Love! I’m in Love!”). He eventually wins her over by pledging to loan money to England to help win their war against Napoleon if the Chancellor of the Exchequer Herries pledges to make Germany and Austria lift their restrictions on Jews. In Germany, Prince Metternich promises roughly the same thing if the Rothschilds make the loan (“Have You Ever Seen a Prettier Congress”). In 1818, Metternich reneges on his bargain, and old Mayer dies, broken-hearted (“In My Lifetime”). His sons scheme to force Metternich to come to terms by continually undercutting his price for peace bonds, although the plan brings them to the brink of bankruptcy (“Bonds”). Metternich not only concedes but is forced to guarantee that all state bonds will be handled by the House of Rothschild. The ghetto walls are torn down, and Mayer's dream is realized.

Song list

Act I
 Prologue: Pleasure and Privilege – Prince William of Hesse
 One Room – Mayer and Gutele (Mama)
 He Tossed a Coin – Mayer, Vendors and Ensemble
 Sons – Mayer, Gutele, Young Amshel, Young Solomon, Young Nathan and Young Jacob
 Everything – Nathan, Gutele, Solomon, Kalman, Amshel and Jacob
 Rothschild and Sons – Mayer, Nathan, Solomon, Kalman, Amshel and Jacob
 Allons – Joseph Fouche and Male Ensemble
 Rothschild and Sons (reprise) – Mayer, Nathan, Solomon, Kalman, Amshel and Jacob
 Sons (reprise) – Gutele (Mama) Rothschild and Mayer Rothschild

Act II
 Hymn: Give England Strength – Herries and Male Ensemble
 This Amazing London Town – Nathan Rothschild
 They Say – Sceptic and Male Ensemble
 I'm in Love! I'm in Love! – Nathan Rothschild
 I'm in Love! I'm in Love! (reprise) – Hannah Cohen
 In My Own Lifetime – Mayer Rothschild
 Have You Ever Seen a Prettier Little Congress? – Prince Metternich
 Stability – Prince Metternich and Ensemble
 Bonds – Nathan, Solomon, Kalman, Amshel, Jacob, Prince Metternich and Ensemble

Adaptation: Rothschild & Sons
In 2015, Harnick and Yellen revised the musical as Rothschild & Sons, greatly restructuring the book as a one-act show and adding previously written but unheard Harnick and Bock songs. The story focuses on Mayer Rothschild's relationships with his sons.  It was produced off-Broadway by York Theatre at the Theater at St. Peter's from October to November 2015 and directed by Jeffrey B. Moss. Robert Cuccioli, who played Nathan Rothschild in the 1990 production, played Mayer, Glory Crampton was Gutele. The production received mixed notices.  Musical Theatre Review wrote that "Harnick has also written a host of clear, concise lyrics that help further the plot, and the storytelling is further enhanced by Moss’ fluid staging and a host of fine performances, especially the powerful portrayal of Mayer by Robert Cuccioli."  Elyse Sommer, writing in CurtainUp, opined that "Rothschild & Sons does indeed offer a refreshing new look at this show's best features:  its many sparkling period flavored songs with their narrative pushing lyrics, and the smart compression of that narrative."  Victor Gluck called the production "engrossing and admirable," while The New York Times praised the "rich new production", noting the "splendid 18th-century men’s costumes by Carrie Robbins, low-key yet opulent scenic design (palaces versus the Frankfurt ghetto) by James Morgan [and] assertively nuanced lighting by Kirk Bookman." The show was recorded on JAY Records and filmed for the archive at Lincoln Center.

Awards and nominations

Notes

References

External links
 
Information about the off-Broadway revival
Synopsis, analysis and other information
The Rothschilds at the Guide to Musical Theatre website
 The Rothschilds at the Music Theatre International website

1970 musicals
Broadway musicals
Musicals by Jerry Bock
Musicals by Sheldon Harnick
Musicals inspired by real-life events
Plays set in Europe
Plays set in the 18th century
Plays set in the 19th century

Tony Award-winning musicals